Hip Hip Hura is Chrisye's eleventh studio album, recorded in collaboration with Adjie Soetama. It was released in 1985 by Musica Studios. The album, with a similar beat to the earlier Aku Cinta Dia, was later certified silver. However, Chrisye was accused of plagiarism over the title song owing to similarities between it and Kenny Loggins' song "Footloose".

Recording
Hip Hip Hura was Chrisye's second collaboration with Adjie Soetama, after Aku Cinta Dia, which was released earlier that year. Chrisye later stated that Hip Hip Hura was the second part of light beat trilogy, after Aku Cinta Dia but before 1986's Nona Lisa.

Alex Hasyim, who had previously worked on Aku Cinta Dia, was booked as choreographer for Chrisye. Although initially unsure of the possibilities owing to the singer's well known stiff stage persona, Hasyim later noted that Chrisye enjoyed the choreography. He kept the dance moves simple to avoid breaking Chrisye's concentration while singing.

Track list

Reception
Despite Chrisye's concerns that the fast tempo did not work for him, Hip Hip Hura was well received. It was certified silver in 1986, with the title song "Hip Hip Hura" receiving a BASF award. In his biography, Chrisye stated that the public was still riding the "euphoria" of Aku Cinta Dia, which had similar musical styles.

Hip Hip Hura has been reissued twice, once as a CD in 2004 and once as part of the Chrisye Masterpiece Trilogy Limited Edition in 2007.

The title song, "Hip Hip Hura", faced criticism due to its similarity to Kenny Loggins' 1984 single "Footloose"; the public accused Chrisye of plagiarism. He later noted that it was meant to be a translation.

References

Chrisye albums
1985 albums
Indonesian-language albums